Statistics of the Chinese Taipei National Football League for the 1983 season.

Overview
Flying Camel won the championship.

References
RSSSF

1983
1
Taipei
Taipei